Wei (Old Chinese: *) was one of the seven major states during the Warring States period of ancient China. It was created from the three-way Partition of Jin, together with Han and Zhao. Its territory lay between the states of Qin and Qi and included parts of modern-day Henan, Hebei, Shanxi, and Shandong. After its capital was moved from Anyi to Daliang (present-day Kaifeng) during the reign of King Hui, Wei was also called Liang.

History

Foundation
Surviving sources trace the ruling house of Wei to the Zhou royalty: Gao, Duke of Bi, was a son of King Wen of Zhou. His descendants took their surname, Bi, from his fief. After the destruction of Bi, Bi Wan escaped to Jin, where he became a courtier of Duke Xian's, accompanying his personal carriage. After a successful military expedition, Bi Wan was granted Wei, from which his own descendants then founded the house of Wei.

Spring and Autumn period
Jin's political structure was drastically changed after the slaughter of its ruling dynasty during and after the Li Ji Unrest. Afterwards, "Jin ha[d] no princely house" and its political power diffused into extended relations of the ruling family, including the Wei. In the last years of the Spring and Autumn period, the founders of Wei, Zhao, and Han joined to attack and kill the dominant house of Zhi in 453 BCE, resulting in the partition of Jin. King Weilie of Zhou finally legitimized the situation in 403 BCE, when he elevated the three houses' heads to the rank of marquess.

Warring States Period
The state reached its apogee during the reigns of its first two rulers, Marquess Wen of Wei and Marquess Wu of Wei. The third ruler, King Hui of Wei, declared himself an independent sovereign and concentrated on economic developments, including irrigation projects at the Yellow River. Hui felt that Qin in the west was weak and their land a barren waste. He focused on conquering the well-settled eastern lands which were richer in known resources. However, a series of battles including the battle of Maling in 341 BCE checked Wei's ambitions while Qin's expansion went largely unimpeded, boosting its economy and military strength.

Early strengthening of the state of Wei resulted from adoption of Legalist reforms proposed by Li Kui (c. 459 – c. 395 BCE).

Defeat
Wei eventually lost the western Hexi (河西) region, a strategic area of pastoral land on the west bank of the Yellow River between the border of modern-day Shanxi and Shaanxi, to Qin. Thereafter, it remained continuously at war with Qin, requiring the capital to be moved from Anyi to Daliang. Wei surrendered to Qin in 225 BCE, after the Qin general Wang Ben diverted the Yellow River into Daliang, destroying the capital in a flood.

Rulers

Marquess Wen of Wei, personal name Si (斯) or Du (都), (445–396 BCE)
Marquess Wu of Wei, personal name Ji (擊), son of Marquess Wen, (396–370 BCE)
King Hui of Wei, personal name Ying (罃), son of Marquess Wu, (370–319 BCE)
King Xiang of Wei (魏襄王), personal name Si (嗣) or He (赫), son of King Hui, (319–296 BCE)
King Zhao of Wei (魏昭王), personal name Chi (遫), son of King Xiang, (296–277 BCE)
King Anxi of Wei (魏安釐王),personal name Yu (圉), son of King Zhao, (277–243 BCE)
King Jingmin of Wei (魏景湣王), personal name Zeng (增) or Wu (午), son of King Anxi, (243–228 BCE)
King Jia, (魏王假), personal name Jia (假), son of King Jingmin, (228–225 BCE)

According to Sima Qian's Records of the Grand Historian written in the first centuryBCE, the list of rulers is slightly different: King Hui died in 335BCE and was succeeded by his son King Xiang in 334BCE. King Xiang died in 319BCE and was succeeded by his son King Ai, who died in 296BCE and was succeeded by his son King Zhao. However, the majority of scholars and commentators believe that King Ai, whose personal name is not recorded, never existed. It seems that Sima Qian assigned the second part of the reign of King Hui (starting in 334BCE, on which date Marquess Hui probably proclaimed himself King) to his son King Xiang and added King Ai to fill in the gap between 319 and 296BCE. On the other hand, a minority of scholars believe King Ai did indeed exist.

Family tree of Wei rulers

Notable people
 Li Kui, a Legalist philosopher and chancellor
 Yue Yang, ancestor of Yue Yi and prime minister of Zhongshan
 Pang Juan, a successful general who was defeated by Lord Mengchang of Qi and Sun Bin at the battle of Maling

Legacy

Chinese legend
According to the Records of the Warring States, a king of Wei had a lover named Lord Longyang, with whom he enjoyed fishing. One day, Longyang began to weep. When questioned, Longyang said he saw his own future in how he had treated a fish. Happy to have the catch at first, Longyang had wanted to throw it back when he caught a better fish. He wept, "I am also a previously-caught fish!  I will also be thrown back!" To show his fidelity to Longyang, the king declared that, "Anyone who dares to speak of other beauties will be executed along with his entire family".

Chinese astronomy

In traditional Chinese astronomy, Wei is represented by one star in the "Twelve States" asterism of the "Girl" lunar mansion of the "Black Turtle" symbol and other star in the "Left Wall" of the "Heavenly Market" enclosure. Sources differ, however, in whether those two stars are (respectively) 33 Capricorni and Delta Herculis or whether they are Chi Capricorni and Phi Capricorni.

See also
 Liang (state), the earlier state of that name
 Liang (realm), the continuation of the title in later dynasties
 Liang (Han dynasty kingdom), the Han dynasty kingdom established on the territories of Wei

References

 
Ancient Chinese states
Jin (Chinese state)
States and territories established in the 5th century BC